Caryonopera is a genus of moths of the family Erebidae. The genus was erected by George Hampson in 1926.

Species
Caryonopera bergeri Berio, 1956
Caryonopera breviramia Hampson, 1926
Caryonopera gabunalis Holland, 1894
Caryonopera mainty Viette, 1972
Caryonopera malgassica Berio, 1955
Caryonopera moenasalis Walker, 1858
Caryonopera pyrrholopha Fletcher, 1961
Caryonopera royi Fletcher & Viette, 1955
Caryonopera triangularis Bethune-Baker, 1911

References

Calpinae